Diego García (born 23 January 1907, date of death unknown) was an Argentine footballer. He played in five matches for the Argentina national football team in 1935 and 1936, scoring four goals. He was also part of Argentina's squad for the 1935 South American Championship.

References

External links
 

1907 births
Year of death missing
Argentine footballers
Argentina international footballers
Place of birth missing
Association football forwards
San Lorenzo de Almagro footballers
Argentine football managers
San Lorenzo de Almagro managers